Bad Shave was the second of five albums of home-made recordings, released by Stephen Jones under the name 'Baby Bird' in 1995.

It was originally a limited edition release, but is now available as part of the 2002 CD box set The Original Lo-Fi. The version of the album released as part of The Original Lo-Fi contains the additional tracks "Past Lasts Longer" and "Why?".

Critical reception

"...unique, customised but never self-indulgent or irritatingly inaccessible. It's as off as it's beautiful, as rich as it's lo fi... imagine Ray Davies emerging, blinking and bearded, Howard Hughes like, after years in the darkness and you'll have some idea of the deeply, deeply English yet marvellously, utterly alien world of Baby Bird." – Melody Maker

Track listing
All tracks written and composed by Stephen Jones.

"KW Jesus TV Roof Appeal" – 3:58
"Bad Jazz" – 3:06
"Too Handsome to Be Homeless" – 3:23
"Steam Train" – 2:36
"Bad Shave" – 3:18
"Oh My God You're a King" – 2:52
"The Restaurant Is Guilty" – 1:49
"Valerie" – 2:16
"Shop Girl" – 3:41
"W.B.T." – 3:54
"Hate Song" – 2:16
"45 & Fat" – 2:41
"Sha Na Na" – 2:41
"Bug in a Breeze" – 3:56
"It's Okay" – 2:27
"Happy Bus" – 2:30
"Swinging from Tree to Tree" – 2:35

Personnel
Stephen Jones – Producer, Played By, Design
Baby Bird – Engineer
P. Blakeman – Engineer 
Ded Associates  – Design

References

1995 albums
Babybird albums